In mathematics, the Newton polytope is an integral polytope associated with a multivariate polynomial. It can be used to analyze the polynomial's behavior when specific variables are considered negligible relative to the others.  Specifically, given a vector  of variables and a finite family  of pairwise distinct vectors from  each encoding the exponents within a monomial, consider the multivariate polynomial

where we use the shorthand notation  for the monomial .

The Newton polytope satisfies the following homomorphism-type property: 

where the addition is in the sense of Minkowski.

Newton polytopes are the central object of study in tropical geometry and characterize the Gröbner bases for an ideal.

See also
 Toric varieties
 Hilbert scheme

Sources

External Links
 Linking Groebner Bases and Toric Varieties
 

Algebraic geometry
Polynomial functions
Minkowski spacetime